Robert Pollard (born June 28, 1981) is a former American football defensive end. Pollard attended Texas Christian University on a football scholarship and graduated with a Bachelor of Science degree in Psychology in 2003. Afterward, he signed with the San Diego Chargers as a free agent (2004), then the Seattle Seahawks (2005–2006) of the National Football League before injuring his knee, ending his NFL career. After spending 2007 recovering from the injury, Pollard signed with the Dallas Desparados of the Arena Football League and played for a year before the entire arena football league was put on hiatus the following year.

He now works as a peace officer in Texas.

1981 births
Living people
Players of American football from New Orleans
American football defensive ends
TCU Horned Frogs football players
San Diego Chargers players
Seattle Seahawks players
Dallas Vigilantes players